The Mongolia national futsal team is controlled by the Mongolian Football Federation, the governing body for futsal in Mongolia and represents the country in international futsal competitions.

Results and Fixtures

2022

2018

2019

Tournaments

Competitive record

FIFA Futsal World Cup

Competitive record

AFC Futsal Championship

Competitive record

EAFF Futsal Championship

References

External links
Football Federation of Mongolia 

Mongolia
National sports teams of Mongolia
Futsal in Mongolia